Red Hill volcanic field, also known as Quemado volcanic field, is a monogenetic volcanic field located in the vicinity of the ghost town of Red Hill in Catron County New Mexico. The area is made up of scoria cone and silicic dome fields. Over 40 volcanic vents have been identified in the field. These erupted basaltic flows, with no other rock types evident in the field.

This crater shows evidence of cycles of collapse and explosive eruption. It is surrounded by olivine basalt flows.

The field is part of the Jemez Lineament, a zone of young volcanic fields stretching from central Arizona to northeastern New Mexico. Ar-Ar dating of rock from the Red Hill volcanic field reveals that it was erupted in two pulses, from 7.9-5.2 million years ago (Mya) and from 2.5 to 0.071 Mya. The older activity was along a narrow zone roughly aligned with the lineament, while later activity was across a broad north-south zone, with the focus of activity tending to move south to north. Future activity is most likely in the northern part of the field.

Notable vents

See also
 List of volcanoes in the United States

References

External links
 

Landforms of Catron County, New Mexico
Volcanic fields of New Mexico
Maars of New Mexico
Pleistocene volcanism
Monogenetic volcanic fields